The City of South Fulton is in Fulton County, Georgia, United States, in the Atlanta metropolitan area. It was incorporated in 2017 from parts of southwest Fulton County and includes the communities of Red Oak, Cooks Crossing, Stonewall, Fife, Ben Hill, Sandtown, Cliftondale, Ono, Cedar Grove, Boat Rock/Dry Pond, Maude, Lester, Enon, Welcome All, Peters Woods, and part of Campbellton. As of 2020, it had a population of 107,436, making it the state's eighth-largest city in population.

History 

The 2016 Georgia General Assembly passed bill HB514 to incorporate South Fulton. Governor Nathan Deal signed the bill into law on April 29, 2016. On November 8, 59 percent of the citizens of what would become South Fulton voted to charter the city. This referendum was part of a “cityhood movement” in the Atlanta metropolitan area that began in 2005 with the incorporation of Sandy Springs on the north side of Atlanta. Several other communities in Fulton voted to incorporate in 2007. With the passage of the South Fulton referendum in 2016, Fulton County became the first county in Georgia with no unincorporated residential areas. As a result, in 2017 Fulton County also became the first county in Georgia to cease providing municipal services such as fire, police, zoning, and code enforcement.  Many former Fulton County personnel and facilities were transferred to the City of South Fulton.

On March 21, 2017, South Fulton held elections for mayor and city council, followed by runoff elections before incorporation took effect on May 1. The first mayor of South Fulton was Bill Edwards, who previously served on the Fulton County Board of Commissioners from 2000 to 2014.  His term expired on December 31, 2021.

In November 2017, after a one-year waiting period mandated by state law, the city council selected Renaissance as the new name for the city after allowing residents to suggest names. More than 200 names were submitted, and the list was pared to 20, including Campbellton (a historical town now partly within the city), Atlanta Heights, Wolf Creek and retaining South Fulton. Following a three-week public notice period and two regular public meetings, which are required to amend the city charter, the city council approved the name change in December 2017. However, Mayor Edwards vetoed the name change on December 18, citing several reasons, including contracts and some public opposition.

In its first eight months, South Fulton created its infrastructure, navigated financial challenges and began a transition from Fulton County services.

Government 

The City of South Fulton operates as a weak mayor form of government. According to the National League of Cities, a weak mayor government includes a powerful council with both legislative and executive authority. The mayor is not truly the chief executive, with limited power. The council can prevent the mayor from effectively supervising city administration. South Fulton's mayor votes only in case of a tie council vote.

The council is primarily responsible for creating and adopting policy via ordinances, resolutions, and amendments. Council members also approve proposed projects, services, events, and purchases above a certain dollar amount. South Fulton's city manager, who reports to the council, manages the city's day-to-day operations and supervises department heads.

Today the city operates with the following departments: City Clerk; City Manager; Communications and External Affairs; Code Enforcement; Community Development; Economic Development (Destination South Fulton); Finance; Fire; Human Resources; Information Technology; Legal; Municipal Court; Parks, Recreation and Cultural Affairs; Police and Public Works. All other services – including utilities, sanitation, elections, public health and others – are managed by Fulton County, or private providers. All public schools within the city are managed by Fulton County Schools.

Demographics

2020 U.S. Census

Map

References

External links
 South Fulton City Government
 The transition page set up by Fulton County
 South Fulton Feasibility Study: Potential Revenue and Expenditures, Andrew Young School of Policy Studies
 Transition plans for new cities, Fulton County, Georgia
 Map of South Fulton's city council districts

Geography of Fulton County, Georgia
Cities in Georgia (U.S. state)
Cities in Fulton County, Georgia
Populated places established in 2017
2017 establishments in Georgia (U.S. state)